Van Gerpen is a surname. Notable people with the surname include:
Bill Van Gerpen (born 1949), American politician from South Dakota
Edward Van Gerpen (born 1938), American politician from South Dakota
Harlan Van Gerpen (1924–2012), American politician from Iowa

Dutch-language surnames